Ginette Mathiot, Officier de la Légion d'Honneur, (23 May 1907 – 14 June 1998) was a French food writer and home economist.

Mathiot wrote over 30 books including the famous Je sais cuisiner which sold over 6 million copies; she also wrote the famous *Je sais faire la pâtisserie (The Art of French Baking), which has been updated and published by Phaidon in 2011. She never married and used traditional cooking methods to design cookbooks which the young wife caring for a young family could read and understand with ease. She is well known in France and her recipes are still used today by some of the most celebrated chefs, and millions of copies of her recipe books have been sold.

She pursued a long career in education, first as a home economics teacher, and later as the Inspectrice générale de l'enseignement ménager de la Ville de Paris then finally as the Inspector General overseeing the teaching of Home Economics in France.

Publications (selected)
La cuisine pour tous
La cuisine pour tous, Je sais cuisiner, The French Pocket Cookbook, or I Know How to Cook is the best known of Mathiot's books. Originally published in 1932 as La cuisine pour tous, it has been updated numerous times (both during and after Mathiot's life), and was retitled Je sais cuisiner in 2002. La cuisine pour tous Albin Michel, 1955 was reprinted by Le Livre de Poche, 1963. It was first translated into English in 1965 as The French Pocket Cookbook (translation by E. B. Hennessy), and then again in 2009 as I Know How to Cook.

Other books
Je sais faire la pâtisserie Albin Michel
Je sais faire les conserves Albin Michel
La cuisine à l'école et à la maison Albin Michel (with Marie-Louis Cordillot & Janine Briand)
Les comptes de la maison Fernand Lanore
Notions de comptabilité familiale Fernand Lanore (with Mme Mereau)

Translations other than English
 1967 : Cucina Internazionale ed Esotica - 600 Ricette da Tutto il Mondo 
 1970 : Världen runt i mitt eget kök 
 1973 : Yo se cocinar: Lo mejor de la gastronomia francesa 
 1978 : Deltas kookboek voor jou en mij 
 1978 : Het grote kookboek van de Franse keuken 
 1993 : Koken voor 2 
 2011 : The Art of French Baking; translated and adapted by Clotilde Dusoulier from Je sais faire la pâtisserie

Footnotes

External links
Robert McG. Thomas Jr Ginette Mathiot, French Cooking Expert, 91; New York Times, 1998
Cynthia Bertelsen Who was Ginette Mathiot? And Why Should You Care?, 2011
Ginette Mathiot. "France: The Cookbook." Phaidon Press, 2016. .

Mathiot, Ginette
Mathiot, Ginette
Mathiot, Ginette
Mathiot, Ginette
Mathiot, Ginette